Trần Nữ Yên Khê (born 1973) is a Vietnamese-born French actress married to the director Tran Anh Hung. She has been in all his films thus far, with the exception of Norwegian Wood. She has alleged, "French people only offer me stereotypical roles of Asian women that men fantasise about."

Early life and education
Trần Nữ Yên Khê was born in  Đà Nẵng, Vietnam. Her mother had been a professor of literature and Chinese at Huế University.

Trần left Vietnam in 1974 at the age of one with her mother and sisters before the end of the Vietnam War. She grew up in Paris. After high school, she attended École du Louvre for one year, before enrolling at École Camondo, where she studied design and interior architecture.

Although Trần is from the  central region of Vietnam, she speaks  Vietnamese with a  northern accent, which she has said discontented her mother.

Partial filmography
The Scent of Green Papaya (1993)
Cyclo (1995)
The Vertical Ray of the Sun (2000)
I Come with the Rain (2009)
The Third Wife (2018)

References

External links

1968 births
Living people
French film actresses
Vietnamese emigrants to France
Vietnamese film actresses
20th-century Vietnamese actresses
21st-century Vietnamese actresses
20th-century French women